Toronto Lake is a lake in Sullivan County, New York. It is located in the town of Bethel.

References
 

Lakes of New York (state)
Lakes of Sullivan County, New York